José Antonio de Mendoza Caamaño y Sotomayor, 3rd Marquis of Villagarcía de Arousa (sometimes marqués de Villa García) (1667 in Spain – 17 December 1746 in Cape Horn) was a Spanish colonial administrator in the Americas. From 4 February 1736 to 15 December 1745 he was Viceroy of Peru.

Early career

José Antonio de Mendoza was a native of Galicia and a knight of the Order of Santiago. He had been ambassador to Venice and viceroy of Catalonia when King Philip V named him Viceroy of Peru in 1735. He took office in Lima, the capital of the Viceroyalty of Peru the following year, at the age of 68 in 1736.

During his administration, war between Spain and England again broke out, the War of Jenkins' Ear, 1739–1748. Viceroy Mendoza organized the defense of the Pacific coast and improved the army and the militia. In 1742 he dispatched a fleet from the port of El Callao to go to defend the coast of Chile.

Scientists
In 1736 Spanish scientists Jorge Juan y Santacilia and Antonio de Ulloa, sent by the French Academy on a French Geodesic Mission to measure a degree of meridian arc at the equator, arrived in the Viceroyalty colony.  Jorge Juan y Santacilia had sailed on the same ship as Viceroy Mendoza. On their return, they reported on the disorganization and corruption in the government and smuggling. The report was posthumously published under the title Noticias Secretas de Américas (Secret News From Americas). Smuggling increased again during this period. The practice was so profitable that merchants were willing to accept the risks

Another French influence on science in the colony was Louis Godin, another member of the meridian expedition. He was appointed cosmógrafo mayor by Viceroy Mendoza. The duties of cosmógrafo mayor included publishing almanacs and sailing instructions. Other French scientists in Peru at this time were Charles Marie de La Condamine and Pierre Bouguer.

Later career
Also during his tenure, an Indigenous peoples revolt for freedom occurred at Oruro (1739) and another led by Juan Santos Atahualpa broke out in 1742 in Oxabamba. This latter revolution gained support in all the native tribes, and also among Mestizos and poor Spaniards. The revolutionaries intent was to drive the Spaniards from Peru. They were unable to do so, but neither were the Spaniards able to defeat them.

In 1740 the Viceroyalty of New Granada was separated from the Viceroyalty of Peru. It had been temporarily separated earlier, from 1717 to 1724 . The new viceroyalty included the territories of Bogotá, Quito, Panama and Venezuela, and also a few territories more directly connected to Lima — Maynas, Jaén, Tumbes and Guayaquil.

Death
Viceroy Mendoza was relieved of his Peruvian office in 1745. José Antonio de Mendoza died on the voyage returning to Spain in 1745.

See also
Viceroyalty of Peru
List of Viceroys of Peru
Indigenous peoples of the Americas
Spanish colonization of the Americas

External links
 MSN Encarta (Archived 2009-10-31)
 Dates of his administration
 Events during his administration

Spanish colonization of the Americas
History of the Americas
History of Peru
Latin American history
1746 deaths
Marquesses of Spain
Viceroys of Peru
Viceroys of Catalonia
Knights of Santiago
1667 births